Arches National Park is a national park in eastern Utah, United States. More than 2,000 natural sandstone arches are located in the park, including the well-known Delicate Arch, as well as a variety of unique geological resources and formations. The park contains the highest density of natural arches in the world.

Administered by the National Park Service, the area was originally named a national monument on April 12, 1929, and was redesignated as a national park on November 12, 1971. The park received more than 1.6 million visitors in 2018.

Park purpose
As stated in the foundation document in U.S. National Park Service website:

Geology

The national park lies above an underground evaporite layer or salt bed, which is the main cause of the formation of the arches, spires, balanced rocks, sandstone fins, and eroded monoliths in the area. This salt bed is thousands of feet thick in places and was deposited in the Paradox Basin of the Colorado Plateau some 300 million years ago (Mya) when a sea flowed into the region and eventually evaporated. Over millions of years, the salt bed was covered with debris eroded from the Uncompahgre Uplift to the northeast. During the Early Jurassic (about 200 Mya), desert conditions prevailed in the region and the vast Navajo Sandstone was deposited. An additional sequence of stream laid and windblown sediments, the Entrada Sandstone (about 140 Mya), was deposited on top of the Navajo. Over 5,000 feet (1,500 m) of younger sediments were deposited and have been mostly eroded. Remnants of the cover exist in the area including exposures of the Cretaceous Mancos Shale. The arches of the area are developed mostly within the Entrada formation.

The weight of this cover caused the salt bed below it to liquefy and thrust up layers of rock into salt domes. The evaporites of the area formed more unusual "salt anticlines" or linear regions of uplift.  Faulting occurred and whole sections of rock subsided into the areas between the domes. In some places, they turned almost on edge. The result of one such  displacement, the Moab Fault, is seen from the visitor center.

As this subsurface movement of salt shaped the landscape, erosion removed the younger rock layers from the surface. Except for isolated remnants, the major formations visible in the park today are the salmon-colored Entrada Sandstone, in which most of the arches form, and the buff-colored Navajo Sandstone. These are visible in layer-cake fashion throughout most of the park. Over time, water seeped into the surface cracks, joints, and folds of these layers. Ice formed in the fissures, expanding and putting pressure on surrounding rock, breaking off bits and pieces. Winds later cleaned out the loose particles. A series of free-standing fins remained. Wind and water attacked these fins until, in some, the cementing material gave way and chunks of rock tumbled out. Many damaged fins collapsed. Others, with the right degree of hardness and balance, survived despite their missing sections. These became the famous arches.

Although the park's terrain may appear rugged and durable, it is extremely fragile. More than 1 million visitors each year threaten the fragile high-desert ecosystem. The problem lies within the soil's crust, which is composed of cyanobacteria, algae, fungi, and lichens that grow in the dusty parts of the park. Factors that make Arches National Park sensitive to visitor damage include being a semiarid region, the scarce, unpredictable rainfall, lack of deep freezing, and lack of plant litter, which results in soils that have both a low resistance to and slow recovery from, compressional forces such as foot traffic. Methods of indicating effects on the soil are cytophobic soil crust index, measuring of water infiltration, and t-tests that are used to compare the values from the undisturbed and disturbed areas.

Arches National Park

Arch Formation 

Geological processes that occurred over 300 million years ago caused a salt bed to be deposited, which today lies beneath the landscape of Arches National Park. Over time, the salt bed was covered with sediments that eventually compressed into rock layers that have since been named Entrada Standstone. Rock layers surrounding the edge of the salt bed continued to erode and shift into vertical sandstone walls called fins. Sand collected between vertical walls of the fins, then slightly acidic rain combined with carbon dioxide in the air allowed for the chemical formation of carbonic acid within the trapped sand. Over time, the carbonic acid dissolved the calcium carbonate that held the sandstone together. Many of the rock formations have weaker layers of rock on bottom that are holding stronger layers on top. The weaker layers would dissolve first, creating openings in the rock. Gravity caused pieces of the stronger rock layer to fall piece by piece into an arch shape. Arches form within rock fins at points of intense fracturing localization, or weak points in the rock's formation, caused by horizontal and vertical discontinuities. Lastly, water, wind, and time continued this erosion process and ultimately created the arches of Arches National Park. All of the arches in the park are made of Entrada Sandstone, however, there are slight differences in how each arch was developed. This allows the Entrada Sandstone to be categories into 3 groups including Slick rock members, Dewey rock members, and Moab members. Vertical arches can be developed from Slick rock members, a combination of Slick rock members and Moab members, or Slick rock members resting above Dewey rock members. Horizontal arches (also called potholes) are formed when a vertical pothole formation meets a horizontal cave, causing a union into a long arch structure. The erosion process within Arches National Park will continue as time continues to pass. Continued erosion combined with vertical and horizontal stress will eventually cause arches to collapse, but still, new arches will continue to form for thousands of years.

Climate
According to the Köppen climate classification system, Arches Visitor Center has a cold semi-arid climate (BSk).

History

Humans have occupied the region since the last ice age 10,000 years ago. Fremont people and Ancestral Puebloans lived in the area until about 700 years ago. Spanish missionaries encountered Ute and Paiute tribes in the area when they first came through in 1775, but the first European-Americans to attempt settlement in the area were the Mormon Elk Mountain Mission in 1855, who soon abandoned the area. Ranchers, farmers, and prospectors later settled Moab in the neighboring Riverine Valley in the late 1870s. Word of the beauty of the surrounding rock formations spread beyond the settlement as a possible tourist destination.

The Arches area was first brought to the attention of the National Park Service by Frank A. Wadleigh, passenger traffic manager of the Denver and Rio Grande Western Railroad. Wadleigh, accompanied by railroad photographer George L. Beam, visited the area in September 1923 at the invitation of Alexander Ringhoffer, a Hungarian-born prospector living in Salt Valley. Ringhoffer had written to the railroad to interest them in the tourist potential of a scenic area he had discovered the previous year with his two sons and a son-in-law, which he called the Devils Garden (known today as the Klondike Bluffs). Wadleigh was impressed by what Ringhoffer showed him, and suggested to Park Service director Stephen T. Mather that the area be made a national monument.

The following year, additional support for the monument idea came from Laurence Gould, a University of Michigan graduate student (and future polar explorer) studying the geology of the nearby La Sal Mountains, who was shown the scenic area by local physician Dr. J. W. "Doc" Williams.

A succession of government investigators examined the area, in part due to confusion as to the precise location. In the process, the name Devils Garden was transposed to an area on the opposite side of Salt Valley that includes Landscape Arch, the longest arch in the park. Ringhoffer's original discovery was omitted, while another area nearby, known locally as the Windows, was included. Designation of the area as a national monument was supported by the Park Service in 1926 but was resisted by President Calvin Coolidge's Interior Secretary, Hubert Work. Finally, in April 1929, shortly after his inauguration, President Herbert Hoover signed a presidential proclamation creating the Arches National Monument, consisting of two comparatively small, disconnected sections. The purpose of the reservation under the 1906 Antiquities Act was to protect the arches, spires, balanced rocks, and other sandstone formations for their scientific and educational value. The name Arches was suggested by Frank Pinkely, superintendent of the Park Service's southwestern national monuments, following a visit to the Windows section in 1925.

In late 1938, President Franklin D. Roosevelt signed a proclamation that enlarged the Arches to protect additional scenic features and permit the development of facilities to promote tourism. A small adjustment was made by President Dwight Eisenhower in 1960 to accommodate a new road alignment.

In early 1969, just before leaving office, President Lyndon B. Johnson signed a proclamation substantially enlarging the Arches. Two years later, President Richard Nixon signed legislation enacted by Congress, which significantly reduced the total area enclosed, but changed its status. Arches National Park was formally dedicated in May 1972

In 1980, vandals attempted to use an abrasive kitchen cleanser to deface ancient petroglyphs in the park, prompting park officials to recruit physicist John F. Asmus, who specialized in using lasers to restore works of art, to use his technology to repair the damage. Asmus "zapped the panel with intense light pulses and succeeded in removing most of the cleanser". In 2016, there was another vandalism event on Frame Arch in the park, where a section if the rock was carved out. Due to advances in technology, in 2018 the arch was repaired through color match and modern infilling methods.

Recreational activities

Climbing on other features in the park is allowed but regulated; in addition, slacklining and BASE jumping are banned parkwide.

Climbing on named arches within the park had long been banned by park regulations, but following Dean Potter's successful free climb on Delicate Arch in May 2006, the wording of the regulations was deemed unenforceable by the park attorney. In response, the park revised its regulations later that month, eventually imposing the current ban on arch climbing in 2014.

Approved recreational activities include auto touring, hiking, bicycling, camping at the Devils Garden campground, backpacking, canyoneering, and rock climbing, with permits required for the last three activities. Guided commercial tours and ranger programs are also available.

Astronomy is also popular in the park due to its dark skies, despite the increasing light pollution from towns such as Moab.

Publicity
Delicate Arch is the subject of the third 2014 quarter of the U.S. Mint's America the Beautiful Quarters program commemorating national parks and historic sites. The Arches quarter had the highest production of the five 2014 national park quarters, with more than 465 million minted.

American writer Edward Abbey was a park ranger at Arches National Monument in 1956 and 1957, where he kept journals that became his book Desert Solitaire. The success of Abbey's book, as well as interest in adventure travel, has drawn many hikers, mountain bikers, and off-pavement driving enthusiasts to the area. Permitted activities within the park include camping, hiking along designated trails, backpacking, canyoneering, rock climbing, bicycling, and driving along existing roads, both paved and unpaved. The Hayduke Trail, an  backpacking route named after one of Edward Abbey's characters, begins in the park.

Plants and animals

An abundance of wildlife occurs in Arches National Park, including spadefoot toads, antelope squirrels, scrub jays, peregrine falcons, many kinds of sparrows, red foxes, desert bighorn sheep, kangaroo rats, mule deers, cougars, midget faded rattlesnakes, yucca mothes, western rattlesnakes, and collared lizards.

Plants also dominate the landscape in the park, including prickly pear cactus, Indian ricegrass, bunch grasses, cheatgrass, lichen, moss, liverworts, Utah juniper, Mormon tea, blackbrush, cliffrose, four-winged saltbrush, pinyon pine, evening primrose, sand verbena, yucca, and sacred datura.

Biological soil crust consisting of cyanobacteria, lichen, mosses, green algae, and microfungi is found throughout southeastern Utah. The fibrous growths help keep soil particles together, creating a layer that is more resistant to erosion. The living soil layer readily absorbs and stores water, allowing more complex forms of plant life to grow in places with low precipitation levels.

Features
Among the notable features of the park are the following:

 Balanced Rock – a large balancing rock, the size of three school buses
 Courthouse Towers – a collection of tall stone columns
 Dark Angel – a free-standing  sandstone pillar at the end of the Devils Garden Trail
 Delicate Arch – a lone-standing arch that has become a symbol of Utah and the most recognized arch in the park
 Devils Garden – many arches and columns scattered along a ridge
 Double Arch – two arches that share a common end
 Fiery Furnace – an area of maze-like narrow passages and tall rock columns (see biblical reference, Book of Daniel, chapter 3)
 Petrified Dunes – petrified remnants of dunes blown from the ancient lakes that covered the area
 Wall Arch – located along the popular Devils Garden Trail; collapsed sometime on August 4/5, 2008

Gallery

See also

List of national parks of the United States
National Register of Historic Places listings in Arches National Park
Natural Bridges National Monument - three natural bridges formed by flowing water
Rainbow Bridge National Monument - the largest natural bridge in the Western Hemisphere

References

Further reading

External links

Utah Office of Tourism page on Arches National Park 
Historic American Engineering Record (HAER) documentation, filed under Moab, Grand County, UT:

 
1929 establishments in Utah
Colorado Plateau
National parks in Utah
Natural arches of Utah
Protected areas established in 1971
Protected areas of Grand County, Utah
Protected areas on the Colorado River
Natural arches of Grand County, Utah
Geotopes
Climbing areas of Utah